Private Josiah Phillips (1830 – December 11, 1894) was an American soldier who fought in the American Civil War for the Union. Phillips served in the 148th Pennsylvania Infantry regiment, a volunteer regiment that was a part of the Army of the Potomac. Phillips received the United States' highest award for bravery during combat, the Medal of Honor. Phillips's medal was won for his capturing of the flag during the Battle of Sutherland's Station on April 2, 1865. He was honored with the Medal of Honor by President Andrew Johnson on May 10, 1865.

Phillips was born in Wyoming County in New York, and entered service in Ulysses, Pennsylvania, where the 148th Pennsylvania Infantry Regiment was recruiting. Phillips is buried in South Lawrence Cemetery in De Pere, Wisconsin.

Medal of Honor citation

See also
 List of American Civil War Medal of Honor recipients: M–P

References

1830 births
1894 deaths
American Civil War recipients of the Medal of Honor
People from Wyoming County, New York
People of New York (state) in the American Civil War
Union Army soldiers
United States Army Medal of Honor recipients
Burials in Wisconsin